Richard of Wetheringsett (fl. 1200–1230) is the earliest known chancellor of the University of Cambridge, where he served sometime between 1215 and 1232.

Most of what is known of Richard comes from his , which he wrote around 1220. This shows that he was a student of William de Montibus at Lincoln Cathedral. Manuscripts of this work variously refer to him as Richard of Leicester, Richard of Wetheringsett, or Richard de Montibus, and some as the chancellor of Lincoln Cathedral. He is sometimes confused with Richard Leicester, who served as chancellor of the University of Cambridge in 1349–50. It has been speculated that he is Richard le Grant, chancellor of Lincoln Cathedral, and archbishop of Canterbury from 1229 until his premature death in 1231.

References 

Year of birth unknown
1230 deaths
13th-century English Roman Catholic theologians
Chancellors of the University of Cambridge
13th-century Latin writers